Mannuem is a rural locality in the South Burnett Region, Queensland, Australia. In the  Mannuem had a population of 90 people.

Geography
The land use is grazing on native vegetation in the west of the locality with crop growing in the east.

There are a number of homesteads in the locality, including:
 Blaxland
 Blaxland
 Brolga Downs
 Glanvillan
 Glanvillan
 Highfield
 Manneum Park
 Mannuem Brae
 Mannuem Glen
 Pagans Paddock
 Redbank
 Rose Hill
 The Cedors

History 
Reedy Creek Provisional School opened on 5 June 1911. Mannuem Creek Provisional School opened on 12 June 1911. The two schools operated as half-time schools (meaning they shared a single teacher). Reedy Creek Provisional School closed on 30 September 1912, enabling Mannuem Creek Provision School to be a full-time school. On 1 August 1913, it became Mannuem Creek State School. On 27 July 1916, Reedy Creek State School was opened. Reedy Creek State School closed on 31 December 1963, while Mannuem Creek State School closed in 1983. Mannuem Creek State School was on the north-east corner of Mannuem Road and Johnstons Road (approx ).

References 

South Burnett Region
Localities in Queensland